The 7th UIT World Shooting Championships was the contemporary name of the ISSF World Shooting Championships held in Buenos Aires, Argentina, in 1903.
The winners were Emil Kellenberger in the rifle competition and Benjamin Segura in the pistol competition.

Results

300 metre rifle three position

50 metre pistol

References 
 All WCH medallists (ISSF website)
 museo del tiro federal argentino “Copa Argentina”, Réplica de la “Copa Argentina”  La copa se hallaba en custodia del último país ganador, hasta adjudicársela Estonia, en el Campeonato Mundial de Lucerna (Suiza), en 1939. Al ser invadida Estonia, uno de los Tiradores la escondió para preservarla del saqueo y vaya uno a saber que fue de él, por que su secreto no trascendió al reanudarse los campeonatos en 1947, de modo que en Estocolmo se compitió sin la presencia de la copa, cuyo hallazgo recién anunciaría dos años después, el gobierno soviético. Señalemos de paso, que por gentileza de la Embajada de Finlandia, en 1951 es traída a la Argentina, para poder hacer la réplica.
 La Copa Argentina, Máximo Trofeo del Tiro Mundial, Ejecrito Argentino Direccion General de Tiro

ISSF World Shooting Championships
Sports festivals in Argentina
Sports competitions in Buenos Aires
1903 in Argentine sport
1900s in Buenos Aires
Shooting competitions in Argentina